The 2018 Coupe de Calédonie (also known as New Caledonia Cup) was the 63rd edition of the national cup in New Caledonian football. AS Magenta won the title beating Hienghène Sport in the final, earning the right to represent New Caledonia in the 2018–19 Coupe de France, entering the seventh round.

Round of 16
Competed by 12 teams of the 2018 New Caledonia Super Ligue and four teams which qualified from provincial competitions (one from Islands, one from North, two from South).

|-
!colspan=3|4 August 2018

|-
!colspan=3|5 August 2018

|}

Quarter-finals

|-
!colspan=3|1 September 2018

|-
!colspan=3|2 September 2018

|}

Semi-finals

|-
!colspan=3|6 October 2018 (Stade Numa-Daly, Nouméa)

|}

Final

|-
!colspan=3|13 October 2018 (Stade Numa-Daly, Nouméa)

|}

See also
2018 New Caledonia Super Ligue

References

External links
Coupe de Calédonie , Fédération Calédonienne de Football

Football competitions in New Caledonia
New Caledonia
2018 in New Caledonian sport